The 1907–08 Georgetown Hoyas men's basketball team represented Georgetown University during the 1907-08 Intercollegiate Athletic Association of the United States college basketball season. Maurice Joyce coached the team in his first season as head coach. Georgetown was an independent and played its home games at the Convention Hall at 5th and K Streets NW in downtown Washington, D.C.

Joyce had introduced the new sport of basketball to Washington, D.C., in 1892 – the year after its invention by James Naismith – and had fostered its development there over the next 15 years as Director of Physical Education at the Carroll Institute. In the autumn of 1906, Georgetown had hired him as its athletic director with an eye toward developing a men's basketball program at the school, and he had founded the program late that year, in time to field Georgetowns first team in the 1906-07 season. That team had had no coach, relying instead on an elected student manager to provide leadership, monitor the teams finances, and schedule games and practices – roles now performed by the schools athletic department and coach. For Georgetowns second season in 1907-08, Joyce formally became the teams first head coach, although this did not diminish the role of the student manager, who continued in his duties; rather, the head coach acted as a teacher and faculty advisor, available to provide advice to the players during games rather than lead the team on the court. It was not until the late 1920s that the modern role of the head coach as in-game leader emerged.

Season recap

During its inaugural season in 1906-07, Georgetown had played only four games, three of them against George Washington. George Washington had won two of the three games, led by center Fred Rice. When George Washington decided not to field a basketball team for the 1907-08 season, Joyce convinced Rice to enroll in Georgetown University Law School and play for the Hoyas in 1907-08.

In a low-scoring era, Rice got off to a spectacular start with his new team, scoring 20 or more points in four of his first seven games. Starting all seven games he played, he had no free-throw attempts, but he scored 52 field goals, giving him 104 points and an average of 14.9 points per game; only one other Georgetown player would equal his per-game scoring average in the next 35 years. Rice would star for Georgetown for two more seasons before graduating from the Law School.

Considered the first great team in Georgetown men's basketball history, the 1907-08 squad won its first five games before losing an exhibition game to Rutgers and suffering its only regular-season loss to a Pennsylvania team that went 23-4 for the year. The Hoyas finished the season with a record of 5-1 and won the mythical "Champions of the South" title for the year.

Roster
Sources

1907–08 schedule and results
Sources

|-
!colspan=9 style="background:#002147; color:#8D817B;"| Regular Season

References

Georgetown Hoyas men's basketball seasons
Georgetown
Georgetown Hoyas men's basketball team
Georgetown Hoyas men's basketball team